The Good News Voice is a network of Christian radio stations in Missouri. The network is owned by Missouri River Christian Broadcasting, Inc.

The Good News Voice airs a variety of Christian Talk and Teaching programs including; Back to the Bible, Focus on the Family, Grace to You with John MacArthur, Revive our Hearts with Nancy Leigh DeMoss, Insight for Living with Chuck Swindoll, Truth for Life with Alistair Begg, In the Market with Janet Parshall, Love Worth Finding with Adrian Rogers, Turning Point with David Jeremiah, Joni & Friends, and Unshackled!. The Good News Voice also airs Christian music overnight.

Stations
The Good News Voice is heard on KGNN-FM in Cuba, Missouri, KGNV in Washington, Missouri, KGNX in Ballwin, Missouri, and KGNA-FM in Arnold, Missouri. The Good News Voice is also heard in Salem, Missouri through a translator on 94.9 FM and in Rolla, Missouri through a translator on 100.7 FM.

References

External links
The Good News Voice's official website

Christian radio stations in the United States
American radio networks
Radio stations in Missouri